The state anthem of the Republic of Mordovia, also known as "Hail, Mordovia!", is one of the state symbols of the Republic of Mordovia, a federal subject of Russia.

It was composed by N. Koshelieva, with lyrics by S. Kinyakin. The anthem has lyrics in all three of the republic's official languages: Moksha, Erzya and Russian. The refrains of the anthem are a mixture between Moksha and Erzya.

Lyrics

Notes

References

See also
 Music of Mordovia

Mordovia
Regional songs
Culture of Mordovia
Russian songs
National anthem compositions in D major